Lee Seung-hoon (born 22 May 1979) is a South Korean former professional tennis player.

Lee, a number one ranked Korean junior, was a member of the South Korea Davis Cup team in 2000 and 2001. One of his singles rubbers was a loss to New Zealand's Mark Nielsen in a match decided 7–9 in the fifth set. He studied at Myongji University and won a singles gold medal for South Korea at the 2001 Summer Universiade in Beijing. During his career he captured four ITF Futures singles titles, with a best world ranking of 391.

ITF Futures finals

Singles: 6 (4–2)

Doubles: 5 (3–2)

See also
List of South Korea Davis Cup team representatives

References

External links
 
 
 

1979 births
Living people
South Korean male tennis players
Myongji University alumni
Universiade gold medalists for South Korea
Universiade bronze medalists for South Korea
Universiade medalists in tennis
Medalists at the 1999 Summer Universiade
Medalists at the 2001 Summer Universiade
21st-century South Korean people